Kargl is a surname. Notable people with the surname include:

Gerald Kargl (born 1953), Austrian film director
Mario Kargl (born 1986), Austrian tennis player
Martin Kargl (1912–1946), Austrian footballer

See also
Karl (given name)